Body painting is a form of body art where artwork is painted directly onto the human skin. Unlike tattoos and other forms of body art, body painting is temporary, lasting several hours or sometimes up to a few weeks (in the case of mehndi or "henna tattoos" about two weeks). Body painting that is limited to the face is known as "face painting". Body painting is also referred to as (a form of) "temporary tattoo". Large scale or full-body painting is more commonly referred to as body painting, while smaller or more detailed work can sometimes be referred to as temporary tattoos.

Indigenous

Body painting with a grey or white paint made from natural pigments including clay, chalk, ash and cattle dung is traditional in many tribal cultures. Often worn during cultural ceremonies, it is believed to assist with the moderation of body heat and the use of striped patterns may reduce the incidence of biting insects. It still survives in this ancient form among Indigenous Australians and in parts of Africa and Southeast Asia, as well as in New Zealand and the Pacific islands. A semi-permanent form of body painting known as Mehndi, using dyes made of henna leaves (hence also known rather erroneously as "henna tattoo"), is practiced in India, especially on brides. Since the late 1990s, Mehndi has become popular amongst young women in the Western world.

Many indigenous peoples of Central and South America paint jagua tattoos, or designs with Genipa americana juice on their bodies. Indigenous peoples of South America traditionally use annatto, huito, or wet charcoal to decorate their faces and bodies. Huito is semi-permanent, and it generally takes weeks for this black dye to fade.

Western
 
Body painting is not always large pieces on fully nude bodies, but can involve smaller pieces on displayed areas of otherwise clothed bodies. There has been a revival of body painting in Western society since the 1960s, in part prompted by the liberalization of social mores regarding nudity and often comes in sensationalist or exhibitionist forms. Even today there is a constant debate about the legitimacy of body painting as an art form. The current modern revival could be said to date back to the 1933 World's Fair in Chicago when Max Factor Sr. and his model Sally Rand were arrested for causing a public disturbance when he body-painted her with his new make-up formulated for Hollywood films. Body art today evolves to the works more directed towards personal mythologies, as Jana Sterbak, Rebecca Horn, Michel Platnic, Youri Messen-Jaschin or Javier Perez.

Body painting is sometimes used as a method of gaining attention in political protests, for instance those by PETA against Burberry.

Body painting led to a minor alternative art movement in the 1950s and 1960s, which involved covering a model in paint and then having the model touch or roll on a canvas or other medium to transfer the paint. French artist Yves Klein is perhaps the most famous for this, with his series of paintings "Anthropometries". The effect produced by this technique creates an image-transfer from the model's body to the medium. This includes all the curves of the model's body (typically female) being reflected in the outline of the image. This technique was not necessarily monotone; multiple colors on different body parts sometimes produced interesting effects.

Joanne Gair is a body paint artist whose work appeared for the tenth consecutive year in the 2008 Sports Illustrated Swimsuit Issue. She came to prominence with an August 1992 Vanity Fair Demi's Birthday Suit cover of Demi Moore. Her Disappearing Model was part of an episode of Ripley's Believe It or Not!.

Festivals

Body painting festivals happen annually across the world, bringing together professional body painters and keen amateurs. Body painting can also be seen at some football matches, at rave parties, and at certain festivals. The World Bodypainting Festival is a three-day festival which originated in 1998 and which has been held in Klagenfurt, Austria since 2017. Participants attend from over fifty countries and the event has more than 20,000 visitors; the associated World Bodypainting Association promotes the art of bodypainting.

Body painting festivals that take place in North America include the North American Body Painting Championship, Face and Body Art International Convention in Orlando, Florida, Bodygras Body Painting Competition in Nanaimo, BC and the Face Painting and Body Art Convention in Las Vegas, Nevada.

Australia also has a number of body painting festivals, most notably the annual Australian Body Art Festival in Eumundi, Queensland and the Australian Body Art Awards.

In Italy, the Rabarama Skin Art Festival (held every year during the Summer and Autumn, with a tour in the major Italian cities), is a different event focused on the artistic side of body painting, highlighting the emotional impact of the painted body in a live performance more than the decorative and technical aspects of it. This particular form of creative art is known as "Skin Art".

Fine art

The 1960s supermodel Veruschka has inspired bodypaint artists, after influential images of her appeared in the 1986 book Transfigurations by photographer Holger Trulzsch. Other well-known works include Serge Diakonoff's books A Fleur de Peau and Diakonoff and Joanne Gair's Paint a licious. More recently Dutch art photographer Karl Hammer has taken center stage with his combinations of body painting and narrative art (fantastic realism).

Following the already established trend in Western-Europe, body painting has become more widely accepted in the United States since the early 1990s. In 2006 the first gallery dedicated exclusively to fine art body painting was opened in New Orleans by World Bodypainting Festival Champion and Judge, Craig Tracy. The Painted Alive Gallery is on Royal Street in the French Quarter. In 2009, a popular late night talk show Last Call with Carson Daly on NBC network, featured a New York-based artist Danny Setiawan who creates reproductions of masterpieces by famous artists such as Salvador Dalí, Vincent van Gogh, and Gustav Klimt on human bodies aiming to make fine art appealing for his contemporaries who normally would not consider themselves as art enthusiasts.

Since 2005 the Australian visual artist Emma Hack has been creating photographs of painted naked human bodies that visually merge with a patterned background wall inspired by the wallpaper designs of Florence Broadhurst. Hack is best known for the Gotye music video for the song "Somebody That I Used to Know", which uses stop-motion animation body painting and has received over 800 million views on YouTube. Hack now creates her own canvas backgrounds and her work is often featured with live birds, representing nature.  Hack's artworks are exhibited worldwide.

Michel Platnic is a French–Israeli contemporary visual artist. He is known for his "living paintings". He uses multiple mediums including photography, video, performance body-painting and painting . Platnic builds three-dimensional cinema sets that are a backdrop for his video and photography works and then he paints directly on the body of the living models he places within the sets. Using this technique, Platnic brought to life several scenes of paintings made famous by artists Francis Bacon, Egon Schiele, David Hockney and Lucian Freud and placed them in a different context. 
Los Angeles artist, Paul Roustan, is known for his work in body painting and photography which spans both the fine art and commercial worlds. His body painting has garnered numerous awards, including winner of the North American Body Paint Championships.

Trina Merry is a body painter known for camouflaging models into settings, backgrounds and, in her "Lust of Currency" series, famous paintings. Merry's collection was exhibited during Miami Art Basel in 2017 and at the Superfine! New York art fair in May 2018.

Peruvian artist Cecilia Paredes is known for her style of painting her own body to camouflage herself against complex floral backgrounds and natural landscapes.

In the commercial arena
Many artists work professionally as body painters for television commercials, such as the Natrel Plus campaign featuring models camouflaged as trees. Stills advertising also used body painting with hundreds of body painting looks on the pages of the world's magazines every year. Body painters also work frequently in the film arena especially in science fiction with an increasing number of elaborate alien creations being body painted.

The Sports Illustrated Swimsuit Issue, published annually, has frequently featured a section of models that were body painted, attired in renditions of swimsuits or sports jerseys. Also Playboy magazine has frequently made use of body painted models. In the 2005 Playmates at Play at the Playboy Mansion calendar, all Playmates appeared in the calendar wearing bikinis, but Playmates Karen McDougal and Hiromi Oshima actually appeared in painted-on bikinis for their respective months.

The success of body painting has led to many notable international competitions and a specific trade magazine (Illusion Magazine) for this industry, showcasing work around the world.

Face painting

Face painting is the artistic application of nontoxic paint to a person's face. The practice dates from Paleolithic times and has been used for ritual purposes, such as coming-of-age ceremonies and funeral rites, as well as for hunting. Materials such as clay, chalk or henna have been used, typically mixed with pigments extracted from leaves, fruits or berries and sometimes with oils or fats.

Many peoples around the world practice face painting in modern times. This includes indigenous peoples in places such as Australia, Papua New Guinea, Polynesia and Melanesia. Some tribes in Sub-Saharan Africa use the technique during rituals and festivals, and many of the indigenous peoples of the Pacific Northwest Coast of North America now use it for ceremonies, having previously also used it for hunting and warfare. In India it is used in folk dances and temple festivals, such as in Kathakali performances, and Mehndi designs are used at weddings. It is also used by Japanese Geisha and Chinese opera singers.

In some forms of Western folk dance, such as Border Morris, the faces of the dancers are painted with a black pigment in a tradition that goes back to the Middle Ages. In the 18th century cosmetic face painting became popular with men and women of the aristocracy and the nouveau riche, but it died out in Western culture after the fall of the French aristocracy. During the 19th century blackface theatrical makeup gained popularity when it was used by non-black performers to represent black people, typically in a minstrel show. Its use ended in the United States with the Civil Rights Movement of the 1960s at about the same time that face painting re-entered the popular culture as part of the hippie movement of the late 1960s, when it was common for young people to decorate their cheeks with flowers or peace symbols at anti-war demonstrations.

In contemporary Western culture face painting has become an art form, with artists displaying their work at festivals and in competitions and magazines. Other western users include actors and clowns, and it continues to be used as a form of camouflage amongst hunters and the military. It is also found at entertainments for children and sports events.

For several decades it has been a common entertainment at county fairs, large open-air markets (especially in Europe and the Americas), and other locations that attract children and adolescents. Face painting is very popular among children at theme parks, parties and festivals throughout the Western world. Though the majority of face painting is geared towards children, many teenagers and adults enjoy being painted for special events, such as sports events (to give support to their team or country) or charity fund raisers. Face painting is also a part of cosplay practice, and is enjoyed yearly by people who dress up as zombies to dance with the annual worldwide Thrill the World event on the Saturday before Halloween.

Full face paint or a painted black nose is sometimes added when a person is dressed in an animal costume.

Most theme parks have booths scattered around where a person can have a design painted on their face. A similar activity is the application of "instant tattoos", which are paint or ink-based designs that are put on as one unit and removed by means of water, alcohol, soap, or another mild solvent. More elaborate temporary tattoos may be made using stencils and airbrush equipment.

In the military

It is common in armies all over the world for soldiers in combat to paint their faces and other exposed body parts (hands, for example) in natural colors such as green, tan, and loam for camouflage purposes. In various South American armies, it is a tradition to use face paint on parade in respect to the indigenous tribes.

Temporary tattoos
As well as paint, temporary tattoos can be used to decorate the body. "Glitter tattoos" are made by applying a clear, cosmetic-grade glue (either freehand or through a stencil) on the skin and then coating it with cosmetic-grade glitter. They can last up to a week depending on the model's body chemistry.

Foil metallic temporary tattoos are a variation of decal-style temporary tattoos, printed using foil stamping technique instead of ink. On the front side, the foil design is printed as a mirror image in order to be viewed in the right direction once it is applied to the skin. Each metallic tattoo is protected by a transparent protective film.

Body paints

Modern water-based face and body paints are made according to stringent guidelines, meaning these are non-toxic, usually non-allergenic, and can easily be washed away. Temporary staining may develop after use, but it will fade after normal washing. These are either applied with hands, paint brush, and synthetic sponges or natural sea sponge, or alternatively with an airbrush.
 
Contrary to the popular myth perpetuated by the James Bond film Goldfinger, a person is not asphyxiated if their whole body is painted.

Liquid latex may also be used as body paint. Aside the risk of contact allergy, wearing latex for a prolonged period may cause heat stroke by inhibiting perspiration and care should be taken to avoid the painful removal of hair when the latex is pulled off.

The same precautions that apply to cosmetics should be observed. If the skin shows any sign of allergy from a paint, its use should immediately be ceased. Moreover, it should not be applied to damaged, inflamed or sensitive skin. If possible, a test for allergic reaction should be performed before use. Special care should be paid to the list of ingredients, as certain dyes are not approved by the US FDA for use around the eye area—generally those associated with certain reddish colorants, as CI 15850 or CI 15985—or on lips, generally blue, purple or some greens containing CI 77007. More stringent regulations are in place in California regarding the amount of permissible lead on cosmetic additives, as part of Proposition 65. In the European Union, all colorants listed under a CI number are allowed for use on all areas. Any paints or products which have not been formulated for use on the body should never be used for body or face painting, as these can result in serious allergic reactions.

As for Mehndi, natural brown henna dyes are safe to use when mixed with ingredients such as lemon juice. Another option is Jagua, a dark indigo plant-based dye that is safe to use on the skin and is approved for cosmetic use in the EU.

Body marbling

Hands and faces can be marbled temporarily for events such as festivals, using a painting process similar to traditional paper marbling, in which paint is floated on water and transferred to a person's skin. Unlike the traditional oil-based technique for paper, neon or ultraviolet reactive colours are typically used, and the paint is water-based and non-toxic.

Hand art
"Hand art" is the application of make-up or paint to a hand to make it appear like an animal or other object. Some hand artists, like Guido Daniele, produce images that are trompe-l'œil representations of wild animals painted on people's hands.

Hand artists work closely with hand models. Hand models can be booked through specialist acting and modeling agencies usually advertising under "body part model" or "hands and feet models".

Body glitter
The application of glitter and reflective ornaments to a woman's breasts, often in the shape of a bikini top or crop top and sometimes alongside nipple tassels, is known as glitter boobs. Like body paint, this decoration is popular with festivalgoers. Buttocks are also sometimes decorated in a similar manner, and the adornment of the a woman's pubic area is known as a vajazzle.

Media

Body painting features in various media. The popular TV variety show, Rowan & Martin's Laugh-In, featured bodies painted with comedic phrases and jokes during transitions. The Pillow Book, a 1996 film by Peter Greenaway, is centred on body painting. The 1990 American film Where the Heart Is featured several examples of models who were painted to blend into elaborate backdrops as trompe-l'œil. Skin Wars is a body painting reality competition hosted by Rebecca Romijn that premiered on Game Show Network on August 6, 2014.

See also

 
 Body art
 Make up
 Mehndi (so-called henna tattoos)

References

External links
 Ultimate Face Painting Tutorial for Beginners: Your step-by-step guide for learning how to face paint
 World Bodypainting Festival website

Optical illusions
Special effects